Raquel Terán is an American politician serving as a member of the Arizona Senate from the 26th district. She previously served in the Arizona House of Representatives.

Early life 
Terán was born in Douglas, Arizona. Her citizenship was challenged in court by an anti-immigration advocate in 2012, and again after her 2018 election. The lawsuits were both dismissed.

Career 
Prior to being elected to the state legislature, Terán was a community organizer who was active in opposing Arizona SB 1070 that she believed had an "anti-immigrant sentiment." She was part of the successful recall of Russell Pearce, the primary sponsor of SB 1070, in 2011.

Terán was elected in November 2018 to the Arizona House of Representatives, and she assumed office on January 14, 2019. In 2021, Terán was elected chair of the Arizona Democratic Party. On September 15, 2021, Terán was appointed to the Arizona Senate to fill the remainder of Tony Navarrete's two-year term following his resignation.

In 2023, Terán was elected by the Senate Democratic Caucus to serve as the Minority Leader of the Arizona State Senate, succeeding outgoing Minority Leader Rebecca Rios. 

In 2023, after Congressman Ruben Gallego announced his intention to run for the United States Senate against incumbent, Senator Kyrsten Sinema, rumors began to circle that Téran would run for Congress. In mid-January, Téran announced via Twitter that she was highly considering running for Gallego's seat.

References

External links

 Profile at the Arizona Senate
 Campaign website

|-

21st-century American politicians
21st-century American women politicians
Arizona Democratic Party chairs
Democratic Party Arizona state senators
Democratic Party members of the Arizona House of Representatives
Hispanic and Latino American state legislators in Arizona
Hispanic and Latino American women in politics
Living people
People from Douglas, Arizona
Women state legislators in Arizona
Year of birth missing (living people)